The Smart soft drink is developed by The Coca-Cola Company for consumers in China since 1997. It is available in a variety of flavours.  and is available in some places in the United States.

Several flavours of Smart were formerly featured and available for tasting at Club Cool in Epcot at the Walt Disney World Resort in Florida.

References 

Coca-Cola brands
Chinese drinks